This is a list of notable hip hop musicians.

0–9 

 03 Greedo
 070 Shake
 1.Cuz
 100 Kila
 12 Gauge
 12 O'Clock
 2 Black 2 Strong
 2 Chainz
 2 Pistols
 20syl
 21 Savage
 22Gz
 24hrs
 24kGoldn
 2Baba
 2Mex
 2Rare
 3-2
 30 Roc
 347aidan
 360
 38 Spesh
 3D Na'Tee
 4th Disciple
 40
 40 Cal.
 40 Glocc
 42 Dugg
 The 45 King
 5ft
 50 Cent
 6 Dogs
 60 Second Assassin
 6ix
 6ix9ine
 6lack
 The 6th Letter
 808Melo
 88Camino
 88-Keys
 9ice
 9lokkNine
 9th Prince
 9th Wonder

A 

 A Boogie wit da Hoodie
 A+
 A.CHAL
 A.D.O.R.
 A.L.T.
 A-Plus
 A-Q 
 A-Reece
 A-Trak
 Aaliyah
 Ab-Soul
 Abbas Kubaff
 Abd al Malik
 Abena Rockstar
 Abdominal
 Abra
 Abra Cadabra
 Abraham Mateo
 Abstract Rude
 Ace Hood
 Aceyalone
 Achille Lauro
 Action Bronson
 Ad-Rock
 Adaam
 Adam Calhoun
 Adam Saleh
 Adam Ro
 Adán Zapata
 Add-2
 Adeem
 Ademo
 Adrian Marcel
 Aesop Rock
 Affion Crockett
 Afrika Bambaataa
 Afrob
 Afroman
 Afu-Ra
 Agallah
 Aggro Santos
 Agus Padilla
 Ahmad
 Ai
 Aitch
 AJ Tracey
 Aja
 Ajs Nigrutin
 AK Ausserkontrolle
 AKTHESAVIOR
 AKA
 Akala
 Akhenaton
 Akinyele
 Akir
 Akiva Schaffer
 Akon
 Akrobatik
 Ak'Sent
 Al B. Sure!
 Al Kapone
 Al Sherrod Lambert
 The Alchemist
 Alemán
 Alex Wiley
 Alexander Yakovlev
 Alexandra Reid
 L'Algérino
 Ali
 Ali Jones
 Ali Shaheed Muhammad
 Ali Vegas
 Alias
 Alibi Montana
 Alison Goldfrapp
 Alizzz
 All Ok
 Allâme
 Allan Kingdom
 Almighty
 Almighty Jay
 Aloe Blacc
 Alonzo
 Alpa Gun
 Alpha Wann
 Alrad Lewis
 Alvin Risk
 AMG
 Amanda Blank
 The Ambassador
 Amerado
 Ambush Buzzworl
 Amil
 Aminé
 Amir Obè
 Ampichino
 Amplify Dot
 Ana Diaz
 Anderson .Paak
 André 3000
 Andre Harrell
 Andre Nickatina
 Andrey Batt
 Andy Milonakis
 Andy Mineo
 Andy Samberg
 Angel
 Angel Haze
 Angie Martinez
 Anhayla
 Anıl Piyancı
 Anis Don Demina
 Anitta
 Ankerstjerne
 Ann Marie
 Anotha Level
 Ant
 Ant Banks
 Ant Wan
 Antimc
 Antoinette
 Antwon
 Anuel AA
 Anybody Killa
 Aone Beats
 AP
 Apache
 Apache 207
 Apathy
 apl.de.ap
 Apollo Brown
 Applejaxx
 AR-Ab
 AraabMuzik
 Arabian Prince
 Arcángel
 Archie Eversole
 Ari Lennox
 Arivu
 Arizona Zervas
 Arkatech Beatz
 Aron
 ArrDee
 Arthur Dubois
 A$AP Bari
 A$AP Ferg
 A$AP Nast
 A$AP Rocky
 A$AP Twelvyy
 A$AP TyY
 Ash Island
 Ashanti
 Asher Roth
 Asheru
 Ashnikko
 Asian Doll
 A$ton Matthews
 Astronautalis
 Atari Blitzkrieg
 Ateyaba
 The Audible Doctor
 August Alsina
 AugustWntr
 Autumn!
 Avelino
 Awich
 Awol One
 Awkwafina
 AZ
 Azad
 Azealia Banks
 Azet

B 

 B Young
 B-Legit
 B-Lovee
 B-Real 
 B-Tight
 B. Cooper
 B. Dolan
 B.G.
 B.G. Knocc Out
 B.o.B
 Baauer
 Baba Sehgal
 BabiBoi
 Baby Bash
 Baby Boy da Prince
 Baby D
 Baby Gang
 Baby J
 Baby Keem
 Baby Tate
 Babylon
 BabyTron
 Backpack Kid
 Backxwash
 Bad Azz
 Bad Bunny
 Bad News Brown 
 Badshah
 Baeza
 Bahamadia
 Baka Not Nice
 Bali Baby
 BamBam
 Bambaata Marley
 Bamboo
 Bandmanrill
 Bandokay
 Baneva
 Bankroll Freddie
 Bankroll Fresh
 Banky W.
 Bang Belushi
 Bangs
 Bart Baker
 Bas
 Basick
 Bassagong
 Bassi Maestro
 Basta
 Battlecat
 Bausa
 BB Jay
 bbno$
 BbyMutha
 B. D. Foxmoor
 Be'O
 Beanie Sigel
 Beans
 Beat Assailant
 The Beat Bully
 Becky G
 Beedie
 Beefy
 Beenzino
 Beetlejuice
 Bella Alubo
 Bella Thorne
 Belle Delphine
 Belly
 Ben Fero
 Benash
 Benee
 Benny Blanco
 Benny the Butcher
 Benzino
 Berner
 Bertie Blackman
 Beyoncé 
 BewhY
 Bez
 Bhad Bhabie
 B.I
 Bia
 Bianca Bonnie
 Bibi
 Biel
 BIG30
 Big Bank Hank
 Big Body Bes
 Big Boi
 Big Daddy Kane
 Big Ed
 Big Fase 100
 Big Freedia
 Big Gipp
 Big Hawk
 Big K.R.I.T.
 Big Kuntry King
 Big L
 Big Lean
 Big Lurch
 Big Mello
 Big Mike
 Big Moe
 Big Narstie 
 Big Naughty
 Big Noyd
 Big Pokey
 Big Pooh
 Big Pun
 Big Reese
 Big Rube
 Big Scarr
 Big Scoob
 Big Sean
 Big Sha
 Big Shaq
 Big Shug
 Big Smo
 Big Soto
 Big Syke
 Big Zulu
 Big Zuu
 Bigg D
 Bigg Jus
 Bilal Wahib
 Bill Stax
 Billy Drease Williams
 Billy Woods
 Bink
 Bipolar Sunshine
 Birdman
 Bishop Lamont
 Bishop Nehru
 Biz Markie
 Bizarrap
 Bizarre
 Bizniz
 Bizzle
 Bizzey
 Bizzy
 Bizzy Bone
 BJ the Chicago Kid
 Bkorn
 Bktherula
 Blaaze
 Blac Chyna
 Blac Youngsta
 Black Child
 Black Cobain
 Black M
 Black Milk
 Black Nut
 Black the Ripper
 Black Rob
 Black Sherif
 Black Thought
 Blackbear
 B L A C K I E
 Blacko
 Blak Jak
 Blade Brown
 Blade Icewood
 Bladee
 Blanco (British)
 Blanco (Italian)
 Blanco Brown
 Blaq Poet
 Blaqbonez
 Blaqstarr
 Blaze Ya Dead Homie
 BlocBoy JB
 Blockhead
 Bloo
 Blood Raw
 Blu
 Blueface
 Blueprint
 Blxckie
 Blxst 
 Bobb'e J. Thompson 
 Bobbito Garcia
 Bobby 
 Bobby Brackins 
 Bobby Brown
 Bobby Creekwater
 Bobby Shmurda
 Bodega Bamz
 Boef
 Bogdan Titomir
 Bohemia
 Boi-1da
 Boi B
 Boity 
 Boldy James
 Bolémvn
 Bone Crusher
 Bones
 Bonez MC
 Booba
 Boondox
 Boosie Badazz
 Boots Riley
 Bootsy Collins
 Borgore
 Borkung Hrangkhawl
 Bosh
 Boss AC
 Bow Wow
 Boyinaband
 Boy Wonder
 Boys Noize
 Braille
 Braintax
 Brakence
 Bramsito
 Brandon T. Jackson
 Brandun DeShay
 Brandy Norwood
 Brasco
 Brent Faiyaz
 Brigadier Jerry
 Briggs
 Brisco
 Brodha V
 Brodinski
 Bronx Style Bob
 Bronze Nazareth
 Brooke Candy
 Brotha Lynch Hung
 Brother Ali
 Brother Marquis
 BRS Kash
 Bryant Myers
 Brymo
 Bryson Tiller
 Buba Corelli
 Bubba Sparxxx
 Buck 65
 Buckshot
 Buckwild 
 Buddy
 Bugzy Malone

 Bun B
 Burak King
 Burna Boy
 Busdriver
 Bushido
 Bushwick Bill
 Busta Rhymes
 Busy Bee Starski
 Butch Cassidy

C 

 C-Bo
 C Jamm
 C. Tangana
 C-Murder
 C-Note
 C-Rayz Walz
 Cadence Weapon
 Cadet
 Cage
 Cai Xukun
 Cakes da Killa
 Calbo
 Calboy
 Call Me Ace 
 Cam'ron
 Camoflauge
 Camu Tao
 Canardo
 Candy Ken
 Candyman
 Canibus
 Capital Bra
 Capital Steez
 Capo
 Capone
 Cappadonna
 Cardi B
 Cardiak
 Carl Brave
 Carman
 Carnage
 Casanova
 Casey Veggies
 Cash Out
 Cashis
 Caskey
 Casper
 Cassie Ventura
 Cassidy
 Cassper Nyovest
 Casual
 Cazwell
 Cazzu 
 CDQ
 Cecil Otter
 Ced-Gee
 CeeLo Green
 Ceg
 Cellski
 Celly Cel
 Celph Titled
 Central Cee
 Cesar Comanche
 Ceschi
 Ceza
 Chad Hugo
 Chali 2na
 Chamillionaire
 Champtown
 Chance the Rapper
 Chanel West Coast
 Changmo
 Channel 7
 Charizma
 Charlamagne tha God
 Charles Hamilton
 Charli Baltimore
 Charli XCX
 Charlie Charles
 Charlie Sloth
 CHEQUE
 Cher Lloyd
 Chester P
 Chester Watson
 Chevy Woods
 Chi Ali
 Chiddy Bang
 Chief Keef
 Chika
 Childish Gambino
 Childish Major
 Chill Rob G
 Chilla Jones
 Chilli
 Chilly Chill
 China Mac
 Chingo Bling
 Chingy
 Chinko Ekun
 Chino XL
 Chinx
 Chip
 Cho
 Choice
 Choiza
 Choosey
 Choppa
 Chris Brown
 Chris Rivers
 Chris Travis
 Chris Webby
 Christina Milian
 Chrishan
 Christopher Martin
 Christopher Reid
 Chynna Rogers
 Chyskillz
 Chubb Rock
 Chuck Brown
 Chuck D
 Chuck Inglish
 Chucky Workclothes
 Chunkz
 Ciara
 Circus
 Cilvaringz
 Cisco Adler
 Cities Aviv
 Citizen Kay
 City Spud
 CJ
 CJ Fly
 CJ Mac
 CKay
 CL
 CL Smooth
 Clams Casino
 Classified
 Cleo
 Clementino
 Clinton Sparks
 Clueso
 Clyde Carson
 Cochise
 Coco Jones
 Coez
 Coi Leray
 Coke La Rock
 Coko
 Cold 187um
 Colt Ford
 Comethazine
 Common
 Conceited
 Connect-R
 Connor Price
 Consequence
 Contra
 Controller 7
 Conway the Machine
 Coogie
 Cool Breeze
 Cool C
 Cool Nutz
 Coolio
 Copywrite
 Cordae
 Cordaro Stewart
 Cormega
 Corpse Husband
 Cory Gunz
 Cosculluela
 Costa Titch
 Cougnut
 Count Bass D
 Cousin Stizz
 Cowboy Troy
 Coyote Beatz
 Cozz
 CPO Boss Hogg
 Craig David
 Craig G
 Craig Mack
 Craig Xen
 Cream
 Crime Boss
 Criminal Manne
 Criolo
 Cro
 Crooked I
 Crucial Star
 Crunchy Black
 Crush
 Crypt the Warchild
 Crystal Caines
 Crystle Lightning
 Cuban Link
 Cupcakke
 Currensy
 Curtiss King
 Cut Killer
 Cyhi the Prynce

D 

 D Double E
 D'banj
 D-Flame
 D-Loc 
 D-Nice
 D-Shot
 D-Sisive
 The D.O.C. 
 D Smoke
 D4vd
 Da Brat
 Da Grin
 Da L.E.S
 Da Uzi
 DaBaby
 Daboyway
 Daddy G
 Daddy Mac
 Daddy-O
 Daddy Yankee
 Daddy X
 Dadju
 Dadoo
 Dae Dae
 DaHeala
 Dajim
 Damani Nkosi
 Dame Grease
 Damu the Fudgemunk
 Dame Dolla
 Damso
 Dan Bull
 Dan the Automator
 Dana Dane
 Danger Mouse
 Dani M
 DaniLeigh
 Danny!
 Danny Boy
 Danny Brown
 Danny Diablo
 Danny Rodriguez
 Dappy
 Dapwell
 Dardan
 Darell
 Dareysteel
 Dargen D'Amico
 Darkoo
 Dash
 Dave
 Dave East
 Daveed Diggs
 David Banner
 David Dallas
 David Jude Jolicoeur
 David Rush
 David Stones
 Davido
 Dawin
 Dawn
 Dax
 Daye Jack
 Daz Dillinger
 Dazzie Dee
 DC The Don
 DDG
 De La Ghetto
 De Leve
 Deacon the Villain
 Dean
 Dean Blunt
 Deante' Hitchcock
 Dedekind Cut
 Dee Barnes
 Dee Dee King
 Dee Nasty
 Dee-1
 Deezer D
 Deepflow
 Dej Loaf
 Del the Funky Homosapien
 Delyric Oracle
 Dem Atlas
 Demon One
 Demrick
 Deniro Farrar
 Denmark Vessey
 Deno
 Denyo
 Denzel Curry
 Depzman
 Deraj
 Derek Minor
 Derrick Milano
 DeScribe
 Desiigner
 Despo Rutti
 Despot
 Dessa
 DeStorm Power
 Destroy Lonely
 Detail
 Detsl
 Deuce
 Dev
 Devang Patel
 Devin the Dude
 Devlin
 Dexter
 Dez Nado
 Diabolic
 Diam's
 Diamond
 Diamond D
 Diamond Platnumz
 Diamondog
 Dice Ailes
 Didier Awadi
 DigDat
 Digga D
 Diggy Simmons
 Digital Nas
 Dillom
 Dimal
 DinDin
 Dinos
 Disco D
 Disco King Mario
 Disiz
 Divine
 Divine Styler
 Dizzee Rascal
 Dizzy Wright
 DJ Abdel
 DJ Abilities
 DJ Arafat
 DJ Babu
 DJ Caise
 DJ Cam
 DJ Cash Money
 DJ Casper
 DJ Charlie Chase
 DJ Chuck Chillout
 DJ Clay
 DJ Clue?
 DJ Cocoa Chanelle
 DJ Crazy Toones
 DJ Cuppy
 DJ Disciple
 DJ Disco Wiz
 DJ Drama
 DJ Envy
 DJ Esco
 DJ Felli Fel
 DJ Fresh
 DJ Funk
 DJ Fuze
 DJ Green Lantern
 DJ Head
 DJ Hoppa
 DJ Hurricane
 DJ Jazzy Jeff
 DJ Jazzy Joyce
 DJ Kay Slay
 DJ Khaled
 DJ Khalil
 DJ Kool Herc
 DJ Krush
 DJ Lambo
 DJ Lethal
 DJ Maj
 DJ Maphorisa
 DJ Marlboro
 DJ Mehdi
 DJ Muggs
 DJ Mustard
 DJ Neptune
 DJ Paul
 DJ Pooh
 DJ Premier
 DJ Quik
 DJ Rhettmatic
 DJ Run
 DJ Scratch
 DJ Screw
 DJ Shadow
 DJ Skitz
 DJ Snake
 DJ Spinz
 DJ Spinna
 DJ Spooky
 DJ Stretch Armstrong
 DJ Subroc
 DJ Suede the Remix God
 DJ Tomekk
 DJ U-Neek
 DJ Uncle Al
 DJ Webstar
 DJ Whoo Kid
 DJ Xclusive
 DJ Yella
 DJ Yung Vamp
 DK
 DMC
 DLOW
 DMX
 Doap Nixon
 Doc Gynéco
 Doc Shaw
 Doe B
 Doechii
 Doja Cat
 Dok2
 Dolla
 Dolphin
 Dom Kennedy
 Dominic Fike
 Dominique Young Unique
 Domino
 Domo Genesis
 Don Cannon
 Don Q
 Don Toliver
 Don Trip
 Donae'o
 Donnis
 Dope Knife
 Dorian Electra
 Dorrough
 Doseone
 Dosseh
 Dot da Genius
 Dot Rotten
 Double Lz
 Doudou Masta
 Doug E. Fresh
 Doughbeezy
 Down AKA Kilo
 Doyoung
 DPR Live
 Dr. Alban
 Dr. Dre
 Drag-On
 Drake
 Drakeo the Ruler
 Drama
 Dred Scott
 Dree Low
 Dres
 Dresta
 Drew Deezy
 Dreezy
 Drezus
 Driicky Graham
 Drik Barbosa
 Droop-E
 Duckwrth
 Dru Down
 Drumma Boy
 Druski
 Dry
 DTTX
 Dub-L
 Duke Deuce
 Duki
 Dum-Dum
 Dumbfoundead
 Dun Deal
 Duncan Mighty
 Dusty Locane
 Dutchavelli
 Duwap Kaine
 DVLP
 Dwele
 Dylan Brady
 Dyme-A-Duzin

E 

 E-40
 E-A-Ski
 E.D.I. Mean
 E-Sens
 E-Sir
 E.S.G.
 Earl Sweatshirt
 Early B
 East Flatbush Project
 Easy Mo Bee
 Eazy-E
 Ecco2K
 Eekwol
 Ed Lover
 Ed O.G.
 Edan
 Eddie Dee
 Eddie F
 Eddie Kadi
 Eddy Baker
 Edo Maajka
 Eduardo
 Egor Kreed
 Egoraptor
 Egyptian Lover
 Einár
 Eko Fresh
 EL
 El Alfa
 El Da Sensei
 El DeBarge
 El Presidente
 El-P
 Eladio Carrión
 eLDee
 Eldzhey
 Ele A el Dominio
 Elephant Man
 Elh Kmer
 Eligh
 Einár
 Elle Royal
 ELS
 Elucid
 Elzhi
 Emcee N.I.C.E.
 Emicida
 Emile Haynie
 Eminem
 Emis Killa
 Emtee
 Enigma
 Eno
 Ensi
 Enzo Amore
 Eprhyme
 Erez Safar
 Eric B.
 Eric Bellinger
 Eric Biddines
 Eric Reprid
 Eric Stanley
 Erica Banks
 Erick Arc Elliott
 Erick Sermon
 Ernia
 Esham
 Eshon Burgundy
 Esoteric
 EST Gee
 Ethel Cain
 Eugy
 Eva Alordiah
 Eve
 Everlast
 Evidence
 Evil Pimp
 EXP
 Exile
 Eyedea
 Eyenine
 Eypio
 Ezhel

F

 Fababy
 Fabe
 Fabolous
 Fabri Fibra
 Face
 Factor Chandelier
 Faf Larage
 Falz
 Fam-Lay
 Famous Dex
 Fantasia
 Farid Bang
 Farma G
 Farruko
 Fashawn
 Fat Joe
 Fat Nick
 Fat Pat
 Fat Tony
 Fat Trel
 Fateh
 Father
 Father MC
 Fatlip
 Fatman Scoop
 Fatt Father
 Faizon Love
 Fausto Fawcett
 Faydee
 Fazer
 Fedez
 Féfé
 Feis
 Fejo
 Felicia Pearson
 Feloni
 Fecko
 Felly
 Fergie
 Fero47
 Ferréz
 Ferris MC
 Fetty Wap
 Fiend
 Fifi Cooper
 Finesse2tymes
 Fireboy DML
 Fivio Foreign
 FKA Twigs
 FKi 1st
 Flabba
 Flame
 Flav
 Flavor Flav
 Flavour N'abania
 Fler
 Flesh-n-Bone
 Fleur East
 Flipp Dinero
 Flo Rida
 Flo Milli
 Flosstradamus
 Flowsik
 Flow Jackson
 Flying Lotus
 Focus...
 Foesum
 Fonzworth Bentley
 Foogiano
 Foreknown
 Fort Minor
 Fousey
 Foxx
 Foxy Brown
 Francis M
 Franglish
 Frank Ocean
 Frankie J
 Frayser Boy
 Freak Nasty
 Freaky Tah
 Fred De Palma
 Fred Durst
 Fred the Godson
 Freddie Foxxx
 Freddie Gibbs
 Fredo
 Fredo Bang
 Fredo Santana
 Fredro Starr
 Fredwreck
 Free
 Freekey Zekey
 Freeman
 Freeway
 Freeze Corleone
 French Montana
 French the Kid
 Frenchie
 Frenkie
 Fresh Kid Ice
 Fricky
 Frisco
 Fronda
 Froggy Fresh
 Fronz
 Frost
 Fuat Ergin
 Full Blooded
 Fumez the Engineer
 Funkmaster Flex
 Fura
 Fuse ODG
 Future
 Futuristic
 Fuzati

G 

 G-Dragon
 G-Eazy
 G. Dep
 G Herbo
 G Koop
 G2
 Gabriel o Pensador
 Gabriel Teodros
 Gaeko
 Gambi
 The Game
 Gangsta Boo
 Gangsta Pat
 Ganksta N-I-P
 Gary
 Gashi
 GAWVI
 Gazo
 Gee Money
 Geko
 Gemini
 Gemini Major
 Gemitaiz
 General Levy
 General Woo
 Genesis Owusu
 Genesis the Greykid
 Genius Nochang
 Georgia Anne Muldrow
 Georgio
 Gerald Walker
 Getter
 Ghali
 Ghettosocks
 Ghetts
 Ghostemane
 Ghostface Killah
 Ghosty
 Giant Pink
 Gift of Gab
 Giggs
 Gims
 Ginni Mahi
 Ginuwine
 Giriboy
 Girli
 Gloria Groove
 Glasses Malone
 GLC
 GloRilla
 Gnash
 Godfather Don
 Goldie Loc
 GoldLink
 Goody Grace
 Gorilla Zoe
 Gradur
 Grafh
 Grand Daddy I.U.
 Grand Puba
 Grandmaster Caz
 Grandmaster Flash
 Gran Omar
 Gray
 Greekazo
 Green Montana
 Grems
 Greydon Square
 Grieves
 Grimes
 Gringe
 Gru
 Guapdad 4000
 Gucci Mane
 Gud
 Gudda Gudda
 Gué Pequeno
 Guelo Star
 Guerilla Black
 Guess Who
 Guilty Simpson
 Gunna
 Gunplay
 Guru
 Gwen Stefani
 GZA
 Gzuz

H 

 H Magnum
 Hades
 Haftbefehl
 Haha
 Haitian Jack
 Haleek Maul
 Half a Mill
 Hamé
 Hamza
 Han Yo-han
 Hangzoo
 Hanhae
 Hanz On
 Haon
 Hard Kaur
 Hardstone
 Hardy Caprio
 Harris
 Harry Fraud
 Hasan Salaam
 Hash Swan
 Hatik
 Hava
 Havoc
 Havocalist
 Hayce Lemsi
 Hayki
 Haystak
 Headie One
 Heather B
 Heather Hunter
 Heavy D
 Héctor el Father
 Heems
 HeeSun Lee
 Hef
 Hefe Heetroc
 Heize
 Hell Raton 
 Hell Razah
 Hell Rell
 Helluva
 Hemlock Ernst
 Heuss l'Enfoiré
 Hi-C
 Hi-Tek
 Hip Hop Pantsula
 Hit-Boy
 Hittman
 Hobo Johnson
 Hodgy
 Hollow da Don
 Homeboy Sandman
 Honey Cocaine
 Hoodie Allen
 Hoodrich Pablo Juan
 Hopsin
 Hornet La Frappe
 Hot Dollar
 Hot Sugar
 Hotboii
 Houdini
 Htiekal
 Huang Zitao
 Huey
 Huihyeon
 Hungria Hip Hop
 Hurricane Chris
 Hurricane G
 Husalah
 Hush
 Husky (rapper)
 Hussein Fatal
 Hwasa
 Hypno Carlito
 Hyuna

I 

 I-20
 I.K
 Iamsu!
 Iann Dior
 iayze
 Ice Cube
 Ice Prince
 Ice Spice
 Ice-T
 IceJJFish
 IDK
 Idris Elba
 Iggy Azalea
 IHeartMemphis
 Ikka Singh
 Iko The Rainman
 Ilacoin
 Ilhoon
 Ill Bill
 Illa J
 Illenium
 Illmaculate
 Illmind
 Illogic
 Illson
 ILoveMakonnen
 Imen Es
 Imhotep
 Immortal Technique
 Imposs
 Imran Khan 
 Inez Jasper
 Indo G
 Indulekha Warrier
 Innovator
 Inspectah Deck
 Invincible
 IQ
 Irv Gotti
 Iron
 Isaiah Rashad
 Ishmael Butler
 IShowSpeed
 Islord
 Issa Gold
 Ivy Queen
 Ivy Sole
 Iwa K
 Iyanya
 Izi

J 

 J Álvarez
 J Balvin
 J Dilla
 J Hus
 J Smooth
 J-Ax
 J-Diggs
 J-Flexx
 J-Hope
 J-Kwon
 J-Me
 J-Live
 J-Ro
 J-Roc
 J-Son
 J. Cole
 J. Holiday
 J. Martins
 J. Rawls
 J. Stalin
 J.Trill
 J. Valentine
 J. Wells
 J.I the Prince of N.Y
 J.Lately
 J.R. Rotem
 J.R. Writer
 J57
 Ja Mezz
 Ja Rule
 Jabee
 Jack Harlow
 Jack Parow
 Jack the Smoker
 The Jacka
 Jacki-O
 Jackie Hill-Perry
 Jacques Anthony
 Jackson Wang
 Jacky Brown
 Jadakiss
 Jaden Smith
 Jae Millz
 Jala Brat
 Jamie Madrox
 Jamie T
 Jammer
 Jan Delay
 Jah Jah
 Jah Khalib
 Jaheim
 Jahlil Beats
 Jahred
 Jake La Furia
 Jake Miller
 Jake One
 Jake Paul
 Jakki tha Motamouth
 Jam Master Jay
 Jamal
 Jamal Woolard
 Jamie Foxx
 Jamie Madrox
 James Brown
 Jamule
 Janelle Monáe
 Jarobi White
 Jarren Benton
 Jasiah
 Jasiri X
 Jason Derulo
 Jason Nevins
 Jasper Dolphin
 Jay1
 Jay Burna
 Jay Critch
 Jay Electronica
 Jay Park
 Jay Rock
 Jay Sean
 Jay Whiss
 Jay Z
 JayDaYoungan
 JayFrance
 Jaykae
 Jayo Felony
 Jayso
 Jaz-O
 Jaz Dhami
 Jazz Cartier
 Jazze Pha
 JB the First Lady
 Jean Grae
 Jeeep
 Jeezy
 Jeffree Star
 Jehst
 Jel
 Jeleel
 Jelly Roll
 Jellybean
 Jennie
 Jennifer Lopez
 Jentina
 Jeon Ji-yoon
 Jeremiah Jae
 Jeremih
 Jermaine Dupri
 Jeru the Damaja
 Jesse Dangerously
 Jesse Jagz
 Jesse Jaymes
 Jessi
 JetsonMade
 Jewell
 JGivens
 Jharrel Jerome
 Jhayco
 Jhené Aiko
 Jibbs
 JID
 Jidenna
 Jim Jones
 Jim Jonsin
 Jimblah
 Jimmy Prime
 Jimmy Spicer
 Jimmy Wopo
 Jinu
 Jipsta 
 Jireel
 Jisoo
 Jme
 Jneiro Jarel
 Jo Gwang-il
 Jo Woo-chan
 Joe Budden
 Joeboy
 Joell Ortiz
 Joey Badass
 Joey Boy
 Joey Fatts
 Joey Purp
 Joey Stylez
 JoeyStarr
 John Cena
 John Givez
 John Legend
 Johnny "J"
 Johnson
 Johntá Austin
 Joji
 Joker (British)
 Joker (Turkish)
 Jokeren
 Jon Bellion
 Jon Connor
 Jon Z
 JonFX
 Jonny "Itch" Fox
 Jonwayne
 Jorma Taccone
 Joseline Hernandez
 Josh Dun
 Josylvio
 Joyner Lucas
 Joyo Velarde
 JPEGMafia
 JR
 Jr. Gong
 JSX
 JT Money
 JT the Bigga Figga
 Jua Cali
 Jub Jub
 Jucee Froot
 Juelz Santana
 Juggy D
 Juice (American)
 Juice (Serbian)
 Juice WRLD
 Juicy J
 Juju
 Jul
 Julian Marley
 Juls
 Jumpsteady
 Juma Nature
 Jumz
 Junglepussy
 Junhyung
 Junoflo
 Jus Allah
 Just Blaze
 Just-Ice
 Justhis
 Justina Valentine
 Juvenile
 Jvcki Wai
 Jxdn

K 

 K Camp
 K Koke
 K'naan
 K-Dee
 K.Flay
 K-OS
 K-Solo
 K-Trap
 K7
 K.A.A.N.
 K.E. on the Track
 K.O
 Ka
 Kaaris
 Kafani
 Kai Cenat
 Kalash
 Kalash Criminel
 Kalash l'Afro
 Kali Uchis
 Kam
 Kamaiyah
 KAMAUU
 Kamelancien
 Kami
 Kamini
 Kamufle
 Kangol Kid
 Kanary Diamonds
 Kano
 Kanto
 Kanye West
 Kap G
 Karan Aujla
 Karan Singh Arora
 Kardinal Offishall
 Karlous Miller
 Karol Conká
 Karri Koira
 Karriem Riggins
 Kash Doll
 Ka$hdami
 Kastro
 Kat Dahlia
 Kat DeLuna
 Katey Red
 Katie Got Bandz
 Katt Williams
 Kay Flock
 Kay One 
 KayCyy
 Kayna Samet
 Kaytranada
 Kaza
 KB
 KC Rebell
 Keak da Sneak
 KeBlack
 Keef Cowboy
 Kehlani
 Keişan
 Keith Ape
 Keith Murray
 Keith Shocklee
 Kel Spencer
 Kelechi
 Kelis
 Kellee Maize
 Kemba
 Ken Carson
 Kendo Kaponi
 Kendrick Lamar
 Kenny Beats
 Kenny Mason
 Kenny Segal
 Kent Jones
 Keny Arkana
 Kerser
 Kery James
 Kesha
 Kev Brown
 Kevin Abstract
 Kevin Federline
 Kevin Gates
 Kevin McCall
 Kevin Rudolf
 Key
 Key Glock
 Kevin Fret
 Keyshia Cole
 Khalid
 Khaligraph Jones
 Khea
 Khia
 Khingz
 Khleo
 Khontkar
 Khuli Chana
 Kia Shine
 Kid Bookie
 Kid Buu
 Kid Capri
 Kid Cudi
 Kid Frost
 Kid Ink
 Kid Koala
 Kid Milli
 Kid Rock
 Kid Sensation
 Kid Sister
 Kidd Kidd
 KiDi
 Kiing Shooter
 Killa Hakan
 Killa Kela
 Killa Sin
 Killagramz
 Killah Priest
 Killer Mike
 KILLY
 Kilo Ali
 Kim Dracula
 Kim Jin-pyo
 Kim Yu-bin
 Kinetic 9
 King
 King Chip
 King Gordy
 King Kaka
 King L
 King Lil G
 King T
 King Tech
 King Von
 Kings
 Kinnie Starr
 Kino
 Kirk Knight
 Kirko Bangz
 Kisum
 KittiB
 Kitty
 Kitty Kat
 KJ-52
 Knero Lapaé
 Knightowl
 Kno
 Knoc-turn'al
 Knucks
 Knxwledge
 KO
 Koba LaD
 Kodak Black
 Koffee
 KOHH
 Kohndo
 Kokane
 Kollegah
 Kool A.D.
 Kool G Rap
 Kool Herc
 Kool Keith
 Kool Moe Dee
 Kool Savas
 Kool Shen
 Koolade
 Koopsta Knicca
 Kore
 The Koreatown Oddity
 Korede Bello
 Koriass
 Kosha Dillz
 Kossisko
 Koolade
 Kota the Friend
 Kraantje Pappie
 Krayzie Bone
 Kreayshawn
 Krisko
 Kris Kross
 Kris Wu
 Kristoff Krane
 Krizz Kaliko
 Krondon
 KRS-One
 KR$NA
 KSI
 Kubilay Karça
 Kung Fu Vampire
 Kurious
 Kurtis Blow
 Kurtis Mantronik
 Kurupt
 Kutt Calhoun
 Kwamé
 Kwayzar
 Kwesi Arthur
 Kwesta
 Ky-Mani
 Kydd
 Kyle
 Kyle Massey
 Kyle Rapps
 Kyprios

L 

 L.E.G.A.C.Y.
 L.O.C.
 L.T. Hutton
 La Chat
 La the Darkman
 La Fouine
 Labrinth
 Lacrim
 Ladipoe
 Lady
 Ladyfag
 Lady B
 Lady Crush
 Lady Donli
 Lady Luck
 Lady May
 The Lady of Rage
 Lakim Shabazz
 Lakeyah
 Lakutis
 Lali Espósito
 Lamix
 Lamont Sincere
 Lancey Foux
 Large Professor
 Larry
 Larry June
 Larry Larr
 Larry Smith
 Lartiste
 Lary
 Latto
 Laufer
 Laura Les
 Laure
 Lauryn Hill
 Laycon
 Laylow
 Layzie Bone
 Lazarus
 Lazerbeak
 LD
 LE
 Le1f
 Leck
 Lecrae
 Lee Min-hyuk
 Lee on the Beats
 Lee Scott
 Lee Young-ji
 Leellamarz
 Lefa
 Left Brain
 Lele
 Left Eye
 Lege Kale
 Leila K
 Lethal Bizzle
 Leto
 Lex Luger
 Lexie Liu
 Lexii Alijai
 Lido
 Ligalize
 Like
 Lil Aaron
 Lil B
 Lil Baby
 Lil Bibby
 Lil Bo Weep
 Lil Boi
 Lil C-Note
 Lil Debbie
 Lil Dicky
 Lil Durk
 Lil Duval
 Lil Eazy-E
 Lil Flip
 Lil Ghost
 Lil Gnar
 Lil Gotit
 Lil Huddy
 Lil Jon
 Lil Keed
 Lil Kesh
 Lil Loaded
 Lil Lotus
 Lil Mama
 Lil Mariko
 Lil Meech
 Lil Mosey
 Lil Nas X
 Lil Pappie
 Lil Peep
 Lil Phat
 Lil Pump
 Lil Reese
 Lil Ric
 Lil Rob
 Lil Ru
 Lil Scrappy
 Lil Skies
 Lil Snupe
 Lil Tecca
 Lil Tjay
 Lil Tracy
 Lil Twist
 Lil Ugly Mane
 Lil Uzi Vert
 Lil Wayne
 Lil Windex
 Lil Wop
 Lil Wyte
 Lil Xan
 Lil Yachty 
 Lil Zane
 Lil Zay Osama
 Lil Zey
 Lil' Brianna
 Lil' Cease
 Lil' Eddie
 Lil' Fizz
 Lil' Flip
 Lil' JJ
 Lil' Keke
 Lil' Kim
 Lil' Kleine
 Lil' Mo
 Lil' O
 Lil' Ronnie
 Lil' Troy
 Lil' Wil
 LIM
 Lin Que
 Linda Pira
 Lino
 Lio Rush
 Lionel D
 Lisa
 Lit Killah
 Little Simz
 Lizzo
 LL Cool J
 Lloyd Banks
 Locksmith
 Loco
 Logic
 Loki
 LoLa Monroe
 Lomepal
 London On Da Track
 Lonzo Ball
 Loon
 Loopy
 Lord Apex
 Lord Finesse
 Lord Have Mercy
 Lord Infamous
 Lord Jamar
 Lord Kossity
 Loredana Zefi
 Lorenzo
 Los
 Loski
 Lou Phelps
 Lou the Human
 Loud
 Louieville Sluggah
 Louis Logic
 Lous and the Yakuza
 Lovebug Starski
 LoveRance
 Lowkey
 Loyle Carner
 LRoc
 Lsdxoxo
 Ludacris
 Luh Kel
 Luis Resto
 Lucki
 Lucky Daye
 Luckyiam
 Ludmilla
 Lumidee
 Lunay
 LunchMoney Lewis
 Luciano
 Luni Coleone
 Lunice
 Lupe Fiasco
 Lushlife
 Lute
 Luther Campbell
 Lyanno 
 Lykke Li
 Lyrics Born

M 

 M Huncho
 M Lamar
 M Trill
 M-1
 M-Dot
 M.E.D.
 M.I.A.
 M.I Abaga
 M1llionz
 Maaly Raw
 Mac
 Mac Dre
 Mac Lethal
 Mac Mall
 Mac Miller
 Mac Minister
 Mac Tyer
 Mach-Hommy
 Majoe
 Machine Gun Kelly
 Mack 10
 Mack Maine
 Macklemore
 Macnivil
 Madame
 MadeinTYO
 Madman
 Mad Clown
 Mad Lion
 Madchild
 Madlib
 Maejor Ali
 Maes
 Maestro Fresh Wes
 Magic
 Magnolia Shorty
 Mahmood
 Mahogany Jones
 Maino
 Major Nine
 Mala Rodríguez
 Malcolm David Kelley
 Malik B.
 Małolat
 Manafest
 Mann
 Mannie Fresh
 Mano Brown
 Manuel Turizo
 Marčelo
 Marcelo D2 
 Marco Polo
 Mariah Angeliq
 Mariah Carey
 Mario Judah
 Mark B
 Mark Batson
 Mark Battles
 Mark Grist
 Marky Mark
 Marley Marl
 Marlon Craft
 Marques Houston
 Marracash
 Mars
 Marteria
 Marty Baller
 Marv Won
 Marvaless
 Marwa Loud
 Marysia Starosta
 Marz
 Marz Lovejoy
 Mase
 Maseo
 Maska
 Masked Wolf
 Massaka
 Masspike Miles
 Masta Ace
 Masta Killa
 Master Gee
 Master P
 Master Shortie
 Mathematics
 Matisyahu
 Matt Martians
 Matt Ox
 Matt Toka
 Max B
 Max Herre
 Maxo Kream
 Maxsta
 Maya Jupiter
 Mayorkun
 MC Bin Laden
 MC Breed
 MC Ceja
 MC Chris
 MC Daleste
 MC Davo
 MC Eiht
 MC Frontalot
 MC Guimê
 MC Hammer
 MC Jazzy Jeff
 MC Jin
 MC Kash
 MC Lars
 MC Lon
 MC Lyte
 MC Marechal
 MC Mong
 MC Paul Barman
 MC Pressure
 MC Ren
 MC Rene
 MC Ride
 MC Router
 MC Serch
 MC Shan
 MC Solaar
 MC Tha
 MC Trouble
 MC Tunes
 MCA
 McGruff
 MD&C Pavlov
 Me Phi Me
 Médine
 Medikal
 Meechy Darko
 Meek Mill
 Megan Thee Stallion
 Mekka Don
 Melle Mel
 Mellow Man Ace
 Memphis Bleek
 Ménélik
 Merkules
 Merlin
 Mereba
 Mero
 Messy Marv
 Method Man
 Metro Boomin
 Mexicano 777
 Meyhem Lauren
 MF Doom
 MF Grimm
 MHD
 Mia X
 MiBBs
 Mic Geronimo
 Michael Bivins
 Michael Franti
 Michel'le
 MICK
 Mick Jenkins
 Mick Luter
 Mickey Avalon
 Mickey Factz
 Micro TDH
 Microdot
 Midwxst
 Miilkbone
 Mika Singh
 MIKE
 Mike D
 Mike Dean
 Mike G
 Mike Jones
 Mike Ladd
 Mike Mictlan
 Mike Posner
 Mike Shinoda
 Mike Skinner
 Mike Stud
 Mike Will Made It
 Mike Zombie
 Miky Woodz
 Milli
 Mila J
 Milo
 Mims
 Mino
 Mirani
 Miri Ben-Ari
 Miriam Bryant
 Miryo
 MISSPSTAR
 Missy Elliott
 Mist
 Mista Grimm
 Mistah F.A.B.
 Mister Cee
 Mister V
 Mister You
 Mitchy Slick
 Mithra Jin
 Mitsuhiro Hidaka
 Mizchif
 Mndsgn
 MNEK
 Mo'Molemi
 MO3
 Mo B. Dick
 Mod Sun
 Mode 9
 Moka Only
 Mokobé
 Monaleo
 Moncho
 Money-B
 Moneybagg Yo
 Monie Love
 Monica
 Monifah
 Monoxide Child
 Monsieur R
 Monski
 Montana of 300 
 Monte Booker
 Montell Jordan
 Monzy
 Mooski 
 Mopreme Shakur
 Morad
 More or Les
 Morgenshtern
 Morray
 Morrisson
 Mos Def
 MoStack
 MoTrip
 Nova Rockafeller
 Mozzik
 Mozzy
 MP808
 Mr Eazi
 Mr Real
 Mr. Capone-E
 Mr. Catra
 Mr. Cheeks
 Mr. Collipark
 Mr. Del
 Mr. Envi'
 Mr. Gângster
 Mr. II
 Mr. J. Medeiros
 Mr. Len
 Mr. Lif
 Mr. Magic
 Mr. Muthafuckin' eXquire
 Mr. Porter
 Mr. Serv-On
 Mr. Short Khop
 Mr. TalkBox
 Mr. Vegas
 Ms Banks
 Ms. Dynamite
 Ms. Jade
 Ms. Melodie
 Mudd the Student
 Mumzy Stranger
 Munachi Abii
 Munawar Faruqui
 Muneshine
 Murda
 Murda Mook
 Murphy Lee
 Murs
 MV Bill
 mxmtoon
 Mykki Blanco
 Myka 9
 Myke Towers
 Mystikal
 Myzery

N 

 N.O. Joe
 N.O.R.E.
 N.O.S
 Na-Kel Smith
 Näääk
 Nach
 Nadia Nakai
 Nadia Rose
 Naeto C
 Naezy
 Nafe Smallz
 Nafla
 Nafsi Huru
 Naira Marley
 Nathy Peluso
 Napoleon
 Naps
 Nardo Wick
 Nas
 Nasty C
 Natasja Saad
 Nate Dogg
 Nathaniel Motte
 Nature
 Nav
 Navy Blue
 Nayt
 Naza
 Ne-Yo
 Nebu Kiniza
 Necro
 Needlz
 Nef the Pharaoh
 Neffa
 Negra Li
 Nekfeu
 Nelly
 Nelly Furtado
 Ñengo Flow
 Neo da Matrix
 Népal
 Nesli
 Nessbeal
 Newkid
 NF
 Niarn
 Nic Nac
 Nicholas Loftin
 Nick Cannon
 Nick Mira
 Nickelus F
 Nicky Jam
 Nicki Minaj
 Nicki Nicole
 Nicky da B
 Nico Segal
 Nicole Wray
 Night Lovell
 Nigo
 Nikki D
 Nimo
 Nine
 Nines
 Ninho
 Ninja
 Nipsey Hussle
 Niro
 Niska
 Nissim Black
 Nitro
 Nitti Beatz
 Nitty
 Nitty Scott
 Njena Reddd Foxxx
 NLE Choppa
 NO:EL
 No Malice
 Noah Cyrus
 Nobody
 NoCap
 Nocando
 NoClue
 NOE
 No I.D.
 Noize MC
 Noizy
 Noname
 Nonchalant
 Nonini
 Noriel 
 NorthSideBenji
 Nosson Zand
 Not3s
 Nothing,Nowhere
 The Notorious B.I.G.
 Nottz
 Nova Rockafeller
 Novelist
 Noyz Narcos
 Nucksal
 Nujabes
 Numeer
 Numskull
 Nura

O 

 O.C.
 O.S.T.R.
 O.T. Genasis
 Obie Trice
 Oboy
 Octavian
 Odd Nosdam
 Oddisee
 Offica
 Offset
 OG Maco
 OG Ron C
 Oh No
 OhGeesy
 Ohmega Watts
 OJ da Juiceman
 Okasian
 Okmalumkoolkat
 Ol' Dirty Bastard
 Olamide
 Oliver Tree
 Olivia
 Olltii
 Omarion
 OMB Peezy
 Omen
 OMG
 Omid Walizadeh
 Omillio Sparks
 Onar
 L'One
 One
 One Be Lo
 Onry Ozzborn
 Open Mike Eagle
 Opio
 L'Orange
 Orelsan
 Organik
 Orgasmic
 Ori Murray
 Orikal Uno
 Orko Eloheim
 Orlando Brown
 Oryn the Rebel
 Oskar Linnros
 Outasight
 Outsider
 Oxmo Puccino
 Oxxxymiron
 Oz
 ØZI
 Ozuna

P 

 P.C.T
 P.O.S
 Pa Salieu
 Pacewon
 Paigey Cakey
 Paloalto
 Paloma Mami
 Papa Dee
 Papa Reu
 Paper Tiger
 Papoose
 Pappy Kojo
 Park Kyung
 Paris
 PARTYNEXTDOOR
 Passi
 Pastor Troy
 Patron
 Patron the DepthMC
 Paul C
 Paul Wall
 Pavlos Fyssas
 Peace
 Peaches
 Peanut Butter Wolf
 Pedestrian
 Peedi Peedi
 Peewee Longway
 Peja
 Peniel Shin
 Penomeco
 Pep Love
 Pepa
 Peppermint
 Percee P
 Pete Davidson
 Pete Miser
 Pete Rock
 Petey Pablo
 Petter
 Pettidee
 Pezet
 pH-1
 Pharoahe Monch
 Pharrell Williams
 Phat Kat
 Pheelz
 Phesto
 Phife Dawg
 Philthy Rich
 Phonte
 Phora
 Phresher
 Phyno
 Pi'erre Bourne
 Pierre Kwenders
 Pigeon John
 Pill
 Pimp C
 Pink Guy
 Pink Siifu
 Pip Skid
 Pitbull
 PJ Sin Suela
 Plan B
 Planet Asia
 Planetary
 Playa Fly
 Playboi Carti
 Plies
 PLK
 PnB Rock
 PNC
 Pocah
 Poe
 Polo G
 Polow da Don
 Pooh Shiesty
 Poorstacy
 Pop Smoke
 Popek
 Popp Hunna
 Poppy
 Porta
 Posdnuos
 Positive K
 Post Malone
 Poster Boy
 Pouya 
 Powfu
 Ppcocaine
 Pras
 Preme
 Pressa
 Prevail
 Primary
 Primo Brown
 Prince Ital Joe
 Prince Paul
 Prince Po
 Prince Whipper Whip
 Princess Nokia
 Princess Superstar
 Problem
 Prodezra
 Prodigal Sunn
 Prodigy
 Prof
 Professor Green
 ProfJam
 Project Pat
 Prolyphic
 Promoe
 Proof
 Propaganda
 Prozak
 Psy
 Psychosiz
 Ptaha
 Puffy L'z
 Pumpkinhead
 Punchnello
 Pusha T
 Pusho
 Pvrx
 Pyramid Vritra

Q 

 Q Da Fool
 Q-Tip
 Q-Unique
 Quadeca
 Quan
 Quando Rondo
 Quavo
 Quazedelic
 Quebonafide
 Queen Latifah
 Queen Naija
 Queen Pen
 Quelle Chris
 QuESt
 Questlove
 The Quiett
 Quin NFN
 Quincy Jones III
 quinn
 Qwazaar
 Qwel

R 

 R. Kelly
 R.A. the Rugged Man
 Radamiz
 Radioinactive
 Raekwon
 RAF Camora
 Raftaar
 Rah Digga
 Raheem Jarbo
 Rahki
 Rahzel
 Raja Kumari
 Rakim
 Ralo
 Ramey Dawoud
 Rampage
 Ramz
 Randa
 Random
 R.A.P. Ferreira
 Rap Rakesh Sethulingam
 Rappin' 4-Tay
 Rappin' Hood
 Rapsody
 Ras G
 Ras Kass
 Rasco
 Rashad Smith
 Rasheeda
 Le Rat Luciano
 Rauw Alejandro
 Ravi
 Ravyn Lenae
 Raxstar
 Ray Cash
 Ray J
 Ray Luv
 Rayne Storm
 Rayven Justice
 Raz Fresco
 RBX
 Real Boston Richey
 The Real Roxanne
 Really Doe
 Reason (American)
 Reason (South African)
 Rebel MC
 Red Café
 Red Cloud
 Red Spyda
 Reddy
 Redfoo
 Redman
 Redzz
 Redveil
 Reef the Lost Cauze
 Reema Major
 Rejjie Snow
 Reks
 Rels B
 Rema
 Remble
 Reminisce
 Rémy
 Remy Ma
 Rex Orange County
 Rhymefest
 RiceGum
 Rich Boy
 Rich Brian
 Rich Homie Quan
 Rich Kidd
 Rich The Kid
 Richie Branson
 Richie Rich
 Rick Rock
 Rick Ross
 Ricky Rich
 Ricky Rick
 Rico Love
 Rico Nasty
 Riff Raff
 Rihanna
 Riky Rick
 Rilès
 Rim'K
 Rishi Rich
 Rishiking
 Rittz
 RJ
 RJD2
 Rkomi
 RM
 RMR
 Ro James
 Rob Lewis
 Rob Sonic
 Rob Stone
 Robb Bank$
 Roc Marciano
 Rocca
 Rocco Hunt
 Rockie Fresh
 Rockin' Squat
 Rocko
 Rockwell Knuckles
 Rockwilder
 Rod Wave
 Roddy Ricch
 Rodney P
 Roger Troutman
 Rohff
 Roi Heenok
 Roll Rida
 Rome Fortune
 Roméo Elvis
 Romeo Miller
 Ron Browz
 Ron Suno
 Rondodasosa
 Ronnie DeVoe
 Ronnie Flex
 Ronnie Radke
 Ronny J
 Roots Manuva
 Roscoe
 Roscoe Dash
 Rouge
 Rowdy Rebel
 Roxanne Shanté
 Roy
 Roy Woods
 Royce da 5'9"
 Rubi Rose
 Renni Rucci
 Rucka Rucka Ali
 Ruggedman
 Runtown
 Russ
 Russ Millions
 Russell Simmons
 Ruudolf
 Ruyonga
 RV
 Rvssian
 RXK Nephew
 Ryan Celsius
 Ryan Lewis
 Rydah J. Klyde
 Rye Rye
 Rylo Rodriguez
 Rytmus
 RZA

S 

 S-X
 S.Pri Noir
 S1mba
 Sa-Roc
 Saafir
 Saba
 Sabac Red
 Sabotage
 Sacario
 Sada Baby
 Sadat X
 Sadek
 Sadistik
 Safaree Samuels
 Safe
 Saga
 Sage Elsesser
 Sage Francis
 Sage the Gemini
 Sagopa Kajmer
 Sagol 59
 SahBabii
 Saian
 Saigon
 Saint Jhn
 Salaam Remi
 Saleh Babaa  
 Salif
 Salmo
 Salt
 Sam Sneed
 Sam the Kid
 Sameh Zakout
 Samian
 Samra
 Sammy Adams
 Sampa the Great
 Sampha
 Samuel
 Samuel Seo
 Samuel T. Herring
 Samy Deluxe
 San E
 San Jaimt
 San Quinn
 Sanchez
 Sango
 Şanışer
 Sarahmée
 Sarkodie
 Sarz
 Sasha Go Hard
 Sat l'Artificier
 Sauce Money
 Sauce Walka
 Saucy Santana
 Saukrates
 Saul Williams
 Sav Killz
 Savage
 Saweetie
 Scarface
 Scarlxrd
 Scarub
 SCH
 Schoolboy Q
 Schoolly D
 Scoop DeVille
 Scorcher
 Scorey
 Scott La Rock
 Scott Storch
 Scotty
 Scram Jones
 Scribe
 Scrilla
 Scriptonite
 Scrufizzer
 Seagram
 Sean Combs
 Sean Forbes
 Sean Paul
 Sean Price
 Sean Slaughter
 Sean T
 Sebastian Stakset
 Sefyu
 Şehinşah
 Self Jupiter
 Sensational
 Sensato del Patio
 Serengeti
 Serius Jones
 Server Uraz
 Seryoga
 Seth Gueko
 Sev Statik
 Sevn Alias
 Sfera Ebbasta
 Sha EK
 Sha Money XL
 Shabaam Sahdeeq
 Shabazz the Disciple
 Shad
 Shade Sheist
 Shadia Mansour
 Shady Blaze
 Shady Nate
 Shaggy
 Shaggy 2 Dope
 Shaka Loveless
 Shane Eagle
 Shaquille O'Neal
 Shavo Odadjian
 Shawnna
 Shawty Lo
 Shay
 Sheck Wes
 Sheek Louch
 Sheff G
 Shelley FKA DRAM
 Shindy
 Shing02
 Shirin David
 Shiva
 Shlohmo
 Sho Baraka
 Sho Madjozi
 Shock G
 Shorty (American)
 Shorty (Croatian)
 Shorty Mack
 SHOT
 Shunda K
 Shurik'n
 Shwayze
 Shy Glizzy
 Shyheim
 Shyne
 Sidhu Moose Wala
 Sido
 Sik-K
 Silentó
 Silkk the Shocker
 Silla
 Silvana Imam
 Simon D
 Simon Rex
 Sims
 Since
 Sinik
 Sir Jinx
 Sir Michael Rocks
 Sir Mix-a-Lot
 Sirah
 Sissy Nobby
 Sjava
 Škabo
 Skales
 Skalpovich
 Skee-Lo
 Skeme
 Skepta
 Ski Beatz
 Ski Mask the Slump God
 Skinnyfromthe9
 Skinnyman
 Skip Marley
 Skooly
 Skread
 Skrillex
 Skull
 Skull Duggery
 Skyzoo
 SL
 SL Jones
 Slaine
 Slava KPSS
 Slava Marlow
 SleazyWorld Go
 Sleep of Oldominion
 Sleepy
 Sleepy Brown
 Sleepy Hallow
 Slick Rick
 Slim Jxmmi
 Slim Thug
 Slimka
 Slimkid3
 Slowthai
 Slug
 Slug Christ
 Slump6s
 Smino
 Smitty
 Smoke Dawg
 Smoke DZA
 Smokepurpp
 Smooth
 Smoothe da Hustler
 Snak the Ripper
 Sneakbo
 Sneazzy
 Snik
 Snoop Dogg
 Snootie Wild
 Snot
 Snow
 Snow Tha Product
 Soce, the elemental wizard
 SoFaygo
 Sofia Ashraf
 Sofiane
 Sokodomo
 Sokół
 Sole
 Solo
 Solzilla
 Sonaro
 Sonny Digital
 Sonny Seeza
 SonReal
 Sonsee
 Soojin
 Soolking
 Soopafly
 Soprano
 Soso Maness
 Sounwave
 Sound Sultan
 Soul Khan
 Souleye
 SoulStice
 Soulja Boy
 Soulja Slim
 South Park Mexican
 Southside
 Soya
 Soyeon
 SpaceGhostPurrp
 Spank Rock
 Speaker Knockerz
 Special Ed
 Special K
 Speech
 Speedfreaks
 Spice 1
 Spider Loc
 Spoonie Gee
 Spose
 Spot
 SpotemGottem
 S.Pri Noir
 SSGKobe
 ST1M
 Stalley
 Starang Wondah
 Starlito
 Stat Quo
 Static Major
 Statik Selektah
 StaySolidRocky
 Steady B
 Steel Banglez
 Steele
 Stefflon Don
 Stelios Phili
 Stella Jang
 Stella Mwangi
 Stephen Marley
 Steve Lacy
 Stevie Joe
 Stevie Stone
 Stezo
 stic.man
 Sticky Fingaz
 Still Fresh
 Stitches
 Stogie T
 Stoka
 Stomy Bugsy
 Stone Mecca
 Stor
 Stormzy
 Stoupe the Enemy of Mankind
 Street Life
 Stress
 Stretch
 Stromae
 Struggle Jennings
 Stunna 4 Vegas
 Styles P
 Subliminal
 Substantial
 Suffa
 Suga
 Suga Free
 Suge Knight
 Sukhe
 Sultan
 Summer Cem
 Summer Walker
 Summrs
 Sunspot Jonz
 Super Cat
 Supernatural
 Sure Shot
 Sur Fresh
 Swae Lee
 Swagg Man
 Swarmz
 Sway
 Sweet Tee
 Swings
 Swizz Beatz
 SwizZz
 Syd Tha Kyd
 Sylk-E. Fyne
 Syster Sol
 SZA

T 

 T La Rock
 T-Bone
 T-Boz
 T-Nutty
 T-Pain
 T-Rich
 T-Killah
 T-Wayne
 T. Mills
 T.I.
 T.O.P
 Tássia Reis
 Tabi Bonney
 Tablo
 Taboo
 Taelor Gray
 Taeyeon
 Taeyong 
 Tainy
 Taio Cruz
 Tairrie B
 Tajai
 Takeoff
 Taktloss
 Talib Kweli
 Tamer Nafar
 tana
 Tank
 Tankurt Manas
 Target
 Tataee
 Tate Kobang
 Tati Quebra Barraco
 Tay Dizm
 Tay Keith
 Tay-K
 Tayc
 Tayna
 Tay Walker
 TD Cruze
 Teairra Marí
 Tech N9ne
 Tedashii
 Teddy Riley
 Teddy Walton
 Tedua
 TeeFlii
 Tee Grizzley
 Teejayx6
 Teesy
 Teezo Touchdown
 Tego Calderón
 Tek
 Teki Latex
 Tekitha
 Tekno
 Tela
 Tempo
 Tempoe
 Termanology
 Terrace Martin
 Terry G
 Teyana Taylor
 Tha Chill
 Tha City Paper
 Tha Realest
 Tha Supreme
 Tha Trademarc
 Thaiboy Digital
 Thara Prashad
 Thavius Beck
 The 6th Letter
 The D.O.C.
 The Dirtball
 The-Dream
 The Kid Laroi
 The Legendary Traxster
 The Shadow 
 The Weeknd
 Thee Phantom
 Thelonious Martin
 Theophilus London
 Third World Don
 Thomas Pridgen
 Thouxanbanfauni
 Thutmose
 Tiago PZK
 Tiakola
 Tierra Whack
 Tiffany Foxx
 Tiger JK
 Tigrão Big Tiger
 Tiitof
 Tim Dog
 Tim Fite
 Timal
 Timati
 Timaya
 Timbaland
 Timbuktu (Canadian)
 Timbuktu (Swedish)
 Timi Dakolo
 Timothy DeLaGhetto
 Timbo King
 Tinashe
 Tinchy Stryder
 Tinie Tempah
 Tink
 Tion Wayne
 Tkay Maidza
 TM88
 Tobe Nwigwe
 TobyMac
 Todd Terry
 Toddla T
 Token
 Tokyo's Revenge
 Tom MacDonald
 Tom Morello
 Tommy Brown
 Tommy Cash
 Tommy Genesis
 Tommy Wright III
 Tone Lōc
 Tone Trump
 Tonedeff
 Toni Blackman
 Toni L
 Tony Shhnow 
 Tony Touch
 Tony Yayo
 Too Short
 Toosii
 Topaz Jones
 Top Dog
 Topher
 Torae
 Torch (American)
 Torch (German)
 Toro y Moi
 Tory Lanez
 Towkio
 Tracey Lee
 Trademark Da Skydiver
 Trae tha Truth
 Tragedy Khadafi
 Travie McCoy
 Travis Barker
 Travis Miller
 Travis Mills
 Travis Scott
 Traxamillion
 Tray Deee
 Treach
 Trettmann
 Trey Songz
 Trick Daddy
 Trick-Trick
 Tricky
 Trillville
 Trina
 Trinidad James
 Trip Lee
 Trippie Redd
 Tristan Wilds
 Trouble
 Trouble T Roy
 Troy Ave
 True Master
 Trueno
 Trugoy
 Tsumyoki
 Tuks Senganga
 Tumi Molekane
 Tunisiano
 Tupac Shakur
 Turbo B
 Turf Talk
 Turk
 Tweedy Bird Loc
 Twista
 Twisted Insane
 Two-9
 Ty Dolla Sign
 Ty Fyffe
 Tyga
 Tyrese Gibson
 Tyla Yaweh
 Tyler James Williams
 Tyler Joseph
 Tyler, The Creator
 Tyra Bolling

U 

 U-God
 Uffie
 Ufo361
 Ugly God
 Uncle Murda
 Unk
 Unknown T
UnoTheActivist
 Upchurch
 Urthboy
 Usher
 U$O
 Uzi

V 

 V $ X V PRiNCE
 V-Nasty
 V.I.C.
 Vacca
 Vada Azeem
 Vado 
 Vakill
 Val Young
 Vald
 Valee
 Valete
 Velous
 Vanessa Mdee
 Vanilla Ice
 Vast Aire
 Vava
 VC Barre
 Vegedream
 Verb T
 Verbal Jint
 Verse Simmonds
 Vic Mensa
 Vico C
 Victony
 Viini
 Vince Staples
 Vincenzo da Via Anfossi
 Vinnie Paz
 Vinxen
 Vinylz
 Violent J
 Viper
 Vita
 VL Mike
 Volume 10
 Vordul Mega

W 

 Waajeed
 Waka Flocka Flame
 Wale
 Walkie
 Wallen
 Wande
 Wande Coal
 Wangechi
 Warren G
 Warren Hue
 Warryn Campbell
 Watsky
 Wawa
 Wawesh
 Wax
 WC
 Webbie
 Weiland
 Wem
 Wendy Ho
 Wes Nelson
 Westside Boogie
 Westside Gunn
 Wicca Phase Springs Eternal
 Wifisfuneral
 Wiki
 Wikluh Sky
 Wiley
 Will Pan
 Will Smith
 will.i.am
 Willie D
 Willie the Kid
 Willis Earl Beal
 Willow Smith
 Willy Northpole
 Wise Bissue
 Wise
 Wise Intelligent
 Wish Bone
 Wisin
 Witchdoctor
 Wiz Khalifa
 Wizkid
 Won-G
 Wonder Mike
 Wonstein
 Woo Won Jae
 Wooseok
 Wordburglar
 Wordsmith
 Wordsworth
 Wrekonize
 Wretch 32
 Wuno
 Wyclef Jean
 Wyldfyer

X 

 X-Raided
 Xander
 XanMan
 X A T A R
 Xeno Carr
 Xero
 Xiuhtezcatl Martinez
 Xperience
 XV
 XXXTentacion
 XwwwsigisXXChange
 Xzibit

Y 

 Y-Love
 Ya Boy
 Yaki Kadafi
 Yama Buddha
 Yameen
 Yandel
 Yannick
 Yas
 Yasin
 Yaw Tog
 Yazz The Greatest
 YBN Nahmir
 YC
 Ycee
 YDG
 YGD Tha Top Dogg
 Yeat
 Yeeun
 Yelawolf
 Yella Beezy
 YFN Lucci
 YG
 YGTUT
 YL
 YN Jay
 YNW BSlime
 YNW Melly
 Yo Gotti
 Yo-Yo
 Yo Yo Honey Singh
 Yongguk
 Yoni Wolf
 Yoon Mi-rae
 Young B
 Young Bleed
 Young Buck
 Young Chop
 Young Chris
 Young Dolph
 Young Dre the Truth
 Young Dro
 Young Greatness
 Young K
 Young M.A
 Young Maylay
 Young MC
 Young Music DYMG
 Young Noble
 Young Nudy
 Young Roddy
 Young Scooter
 Young Scrap
 Young Thug
 Young Zee
 YoungBoy Never Broke Again
 Younglord
 Youngohm
 YoungstaCPT
 Your Old Droog
 Youssoupha
 YTCracker
 Yubin
 Yuk Ji-dam
 Yukmouth
 Yumdda
 Yung Bans
 Yung Berg
 Yung Bleu
 Yung Filly
 Yung Gravy
 Yung Hurn
 Yung Joc
 Yung Kayo
 Yung L
 Yung L.A.
 Yung Lean
 Yung Mal
 Yung Ro
 Yung Simmie
 Yung Tory
 Yung Wun
 Yung6ix
 Yungblud
 Yungen
 YungManny
 Yury Khovansky
 Yuto Adachi
 Yvie Oddly
 yvngxchris
 Yxng Bane
 YZ
 Yzalú

Z 

 Z. Mann Zilla
 Z-Ro
 Zacari
 Zach Hill
 Zachg
 Zack de la Rocha
 Zack Fox 
 Zane One
 Zaytoven
 Zebra Katz
 Zeebra
 Zelo
 Zelooperz
 Zen-G
 Zeus
 ZieZie
 Zico
 Zifou
 Ziggy
 Zilla
 ZillaKami
 Zion.T
 Zizo
 Z LaLa
 Zlatan Ibile
 Zola
 Zombie Juice
 Zoxea
 Zuna

See also

 List of hip hop groups
 Lists of musicians

References

Music from Hip Hop Artists

 
Hip hop